Kominato may refer to:
Kominato, Aomori, a former municipality in Hiranai, Aomori Prefecture, Japan
Kominato, Chiba, a former municipality in Kamogawa, Chiba Prefecture, Japan
Kominato Line, a private railway line in Chiba Prefecture, Japan
Siaogang District, known as Kominato during Japanese rule of Taiwan, in Kaohsiung, Taiwan